Cecilia Menjívar, born and raised in El Salvador, is an American sociologist who has made significant contributions to the study of international migration, the structural roots of inequalities, state power, gender-based violence against women, and legal regimes. Menjívar is currently a Professor of sociology at the University of California, Los Angeles where she is the Dorothy L. Meier Social Equities Chair.

Education
Menjívar received a Bachelor of Arts in Psychology and Sociology from the University of Southern California in 1981, and a Master of Science in International Education from the same university in 1983. Menjívar then completed her doctoral studies at the University of California, Davis graduating in 1992 with a PhD in Sociology. Menjívar completed post-doctoral fellowships at the University of California, Berkeley and RAND Corporation.

Career
Menjívar worked at Arizona State University from 1996 to 2015, initially as an Assistant Professor before becoming an Associate Professor and finally Cowden Distinguished Professor and Associate Director in the School of Social and Family Dynamics. Menjívar then moved to the University of Kansas where she was Foundation Distinguished Professor in the Department of Sociology and Co-Director of the Center for Migration Research. Since 2018, Menjívar has been Professor and Dorothy L. Meier Social Equities Chair in the Department of Sociology at the University of California, Los Angeles. She was elected President of the American Sociological Association 2021-2022.

Reception
Menjívar's first book, Fragmented Ties, received the 2001 William J. Goode Outstanding Book Award from the American Sociological Association's Section on Family. Her second book, Enduring Violence received the Distinguished Scholarship Award from the Pacific Sociological Association, the Mirra Komarovsky Book Award from the Eastern Sociological Society, and the Hubert Herring Best Book Award from the Pacific Council on Latin American Studies. Her articles also have been recognized with awards and, like her work in general, have been read around the world.

Selected works
Menjívar, Cecilia. Fragmented Ties: Salvadorian Immigrant Networks in America. University of California Press (2000).
Menjívar, Cecilia, Nestor P. Rodríguez. (Eds.) When States Kill: Latin America, the US, and Technologies of Terror. University of Texas Press (2005).
Menjívar, Cecilia. Enduring Violence: Ladina Women's Lives in Guatemala. University of California Press (2011).
Menjívar, Cecilia and Daniel Kanstroom. Constructing Immigrant "Illegality": Critiques, Experiences, and Responses, Cambridge University Press (2014)
Menjívar, Cecilia. Leisy Abrego and Leah Schmalzbauer. Immigrant Families. Polity, (2016).
Menjívar, Cecilia, Marie Ruiz and Immanuel Ness. (Eds.) The Oxford Handbook of Migration Crises. Oxford University Press (2019).

Notes

Year of birth missing (living people)
Living people
American women sociologists
20th-century social scientists
21st-century social scientists
University of Southern California alumni
University of California, Davis alumni
University of California, Berkeley fellows
Arizona State University faculty
University of Kansas faculty
American sociologists
21st-century American women